William T. Lamont (November 27, 1830 – February 12, 1908) was an American merchant and politician from New York.

Life 
Lamont was born on November 27, 1830 in Charlotteville, New York, the son of Thomas W. Lamont. He moved to Richmondville in 1859.

Lamont attended the New York Conference in Charlotteville. He worked as a dealer of produce and stock. He served as a town supervisor for two years, a member of the board of education for several years, and trustee and treasurer of the village of Charlotteville.

In 1891, Lamont was elected to the New York State Assembly as a Democrat, representing Schoharie County. He served in the Assembly in 1892.

Lamont married Mary Rogers of Massachusetts in 1859. They had three children, Ella, Wilbur F., and W. Stanley. His second wife was Adeline Smith. He was a member of the Methodist Episcopal Church.

Lamont died at home on February 12, 1908. He was buried in the Town of Catskill Cemetery.

References

External links 
The Political Graveyard
William T. Lamont at Find a Grave

1830 births
1908 deaths
People from Richmondville, New York
Town supervisors in New York (state)
School board members in New York (state)
Members of the Methodist Episcopal Church
Burials in New York (state)
Democratic Party members of the New York State Assembly
19th-century American politicians
19th-century Methodists